The Battle of the Barents Sea was a World War II naval engagement on 31 December 1942 between warships of the German Navy (Kriegsmarine) and British ships escorting convoy JW 51B to Kola Inlet in the USSR. The action took place in the Barents Sea north of North Cape, Norway. The German raiders' failure to inflict significant losses on the convoy infuriated Hitler, who ordered that German naval strategy would henceforth concentrate on the U-boat fleet rather than surface ships.

Background

JW 51B
The escort commander was Captain Robert Sherbrooke RN (flag in Onslow). The convoy sailed in the dead of winter to preclude attacks by German aircraft, like those that devastated Convoy PQ 17.

Operation Regenbogen

After Convoy PQ 18, the force had waited to attack the next Arctic convoy but their temporary suspension by the British during Operation Torch in the Mediterranean and Operation FB, the routing of single ships to Russia, had provided no opportunity to begin the operation.

Prelude
JW 51B sailed from Loch Ewe on 22 December 1942 and met its escort off Iceland on 25 December. From there the ships sailed north-east, meeting heavy gales on 28–29 December that caused the ships of the convoy to lose station. When the weather moderated, five merchantmen and the escorts Oribi and Vizalma were missing and Bramble was detached to search for them. Three of the straggling merchantmen rejoined the following day; the other ships proceeded independently towards Kola Inlet. Karl-Heinz Herbschleb). When the report was received by the German Naval Staff, Kummetz was ordered to sail immediately to intercept the convoy. Kummetz split his force into two divisions, led by Admiral Hipper and Lützow, respectively.

Battle

Detached from the convoy were the destroyer Oribi and one ship, which took no part in the action;  astern (north-east) of the convoy Bramble was searching for them. At 08:00 the destroyer Friedrich Eckholdt sighted the convoy and reported it to Admiral Hipper.

At 08:20 on 31 December, Obdurate, stationed south of the convoy, spotted three German destroyers to the rear (west) of the convoy. Then, Onslow spotted Admiral Hipper, also to the rear of the convoy, and steered to intercept with Orwell, Obedient and Obdurate, while Achates was ordered to stay with the convoy and make smoke. After some firing, the British ships turned, apparently to make a torpedo attack. Heavily outgunned, Sherbrooke knew that his torpedoes were his most formidable weapons; the attack was feigned as once the torpedoes had been launched their threat would be gone. The ruse worked: Admiral Hipper temporarily retired, since Kummetz had been ordered not to risk his ships. Admiral Hipper returned to make a second attack, hitting Onslow causing heavy damage and many casualties including 17 killed. Although Onslow ultimately survived the action, Sherbrooke had been badly injured by a large steel splinter and command passed to Obedient.

The destroyer Friedrich Eckholdt was ordered to finish off Bramble, which sank with all hands, while Admiral Hipper shifted aim to Obedient and Achates to the south. Achates was badly damaged but continued to make smoke until eventually she sank; the trawler Northern Gem rescued many of the crew. The Germans reported sinking a destroyer but this was owing to the misidentification of the minesweeper Bramble; they had not realised Achates had been hit.

The shellfire attracted the attention of Force R, which was still further north. Kummetz initially thought that the attack of the two cruisers was coming from another destroyer but upon realising his mistake, he ordered his ships to retreat to the west. In another case of mistaken identity, Friedrich Eckholdt and Richard Beitzen mistook Sheffield for Admiral Hipper; after attempting to form up with the British ships, they were engaged by Sheffield with Friedrich Eckholdt breaking in two and sinking with all hands.

Lützow approached from the east and fired ineffectively at the convoy, still hidden by smoke from the crippled Achates. Heading north-west to join Admiral Hipper, Lützow also encountered Sheffield and Jamaica, which opened fire. Coincidentally, both sides decided to break off the action at the same time, each side fearing imminent torpedo attacks upon their heavy ships from the other's remaining destroyers. This was shortly after noon. Burnett with Force R continued to shadow the German ships at a distance until it was evident that they were retiring to their base, while the ships of the convoy re-formed and continued towards Kola Inlet.

Aftermath

Analysis

The encounter took place in the middle of the months-long polar night and both the German and British forces were scattered and unsure of the positions of the rest of their own forces, much less those of their opponent. The battle became a rather confused affair and sometimes it was not clear who was firing on whom or how many ships were engaged. Despite the German efforts, all 14 of the merchant ships reached their destinations in the USSR undamaged.

Hitler was infuriated at what he regarded as the uselessness of the surface raiders, seeing that the initial attack of the two heavy cruisers was held back by destroyers before arrival of the two light cruisers. There were serious consequences: this failure nearly made Hitler enforce a decision to scrap the surface fleet and order the German Navy to concentrate on U-boat warfare. Admiral Erich Raeder, supreme commander of the Kriegsmarine, offered his resignation—which Hitler accepted. Raeder was replaced by Admiral Karl Dönitz, the commander of the U-boat fleet.

Dönitz saved the German surface fleet from scrapping; though Admiral Hipper and two ( and ) of the light cruisers were laid up until late 1944, while repairs and rebuilding of the battleship  were abandoned. Although German E-boats continued to operate off the coast of France, only one more big surface operation was executed after the battle.  This was the attempted raid on Convoy JW 55B by the battleship . The battleship was sunk by an escorting British task force in what later became known as the Battle of the North Cape.

Victoria Cross
Captain Robert Sherbrooke was awarded the Victoria Cross. He acknowledged that it had really been awarded in honour of the whole crew of Onslow. In the action he had been badly wounded and he lost the sight in his left eye. He returned to active duty and retired from the navy in the 1950s with the rank of rear-admiral.

Commemoration
At the memorial for Bramble, Captain Harvey Crombie said of the crew

The battle was the subject of the book 73 North by Dudley Pope and the poem JW51B: A Convoy by Alan Ross, who served on Onslow.

Footnotes

Bibliography
Books

 
 
 
 

Websites

Further reading
Books
 
 
 
 
 

Websites

External links
 Battle of the Barents Sea — comprehensive article by Irwin J. Kappes
 Coxswain Sid Kerslake of armed trawler "Northern Gem" during Convoy JW.51B and the Battle of the Barents Sea

Arctic naval operations of World War II
Barents Sea
Barents Sea
Naval battles of World War II involving Germany
Naval battles of World War II involving the United Kingdom
December 1942 events
Germany–United Kingdom military relations